Bellegarde is a French surname derived from a toponym meaning "beautiful watch-tower or look-out" and may refer to the following:

 Dantès Bellegarde (1877–1966), Haitian historian and diplomat
 Perry Bellegarde (born 1962), national chief of the Canadian Assembly of First Nations
 Roger de Saint-Lary de Bellegarde (died 1579)
 Roger de Saint-Lary de Termes (1562–1646), duc de Bellegarde
 Sophie Lalive de Bellegarde, French writer
 Count Heinrich von Bellegarde (1756–1845), Austrian General of the French Revolutionary Wars

See also
Bellegarde (disambiguation)

Notes

French-language surnames